Kieran O'Malley (born 12 May 1988) is a British volleyball player. Born in Halifax, West Yorkshire, England, he competed for Great Britain in the men's tournament at the 2012 Summer Olympics. His team includes Gilberto Amaury de Godoy Filho, or just known as Giba.  As of 2012, he played for the Dutch team Abiant Lycurgus.

References

English men's volleyball players
Volleyball players at the 2012 Summer Olympics
Olympic volleyball players of Great Britain
1988 births
Living people
Sportspeople from Halifax, West Yorkshire